Jesús María Pérez Silva (born 15 July 1984) is a Venezuelan former professional track and road racing cyclist.

Major results
Source:

2003
 1st Stage 11 Vuelta a Venezuela
2004
 9th Road race, Pan American Under-23 Road Championships
2005
 1st Stage 4 Vuelta Ciclista Aragua
 Vuelta a Yacambu-Lara
1st Stages 1, 2b & 6
 1st Stage 2 Vuelta a Venezuela
 Vuelta a Sucre
1st Stages 1 & 2
 1st Stage 2 Vuelta al Estado Zulia
2006
 Vuelta al Táchira
1st Stages 1 & 2
 Vuelta al Estado Yaracuy
1st Stages 1, 4a & 5
 1st Stage 4 Volta do Paraná
 1st Stage 5 Vuelta a Sucre
 2nd Overall Vuelta al Estado Zulia
1st Stages 1 & 3
2007
 1st Stage 5 Vuelta a la Comunidad de Madrid
 1st Stage 5 Vuelta a Venezuela
 Vuelta al Estado Zulia
1st Stages 3 & 4a
2008
 1st Overall GP Alto Apure
 1st Stage 6b Tour du Maroc
 1st Stage 10 Vuelta a Venezuela
 1st Stage 6 Vuelta al Estado Zulia
2009
 Clásica San Eleuterio Barinitas
1st Stages 1 & 3
 Vuelta a Venezuela
1st Stages 5 & 12
 1st Stage 1b Vuelta a Lara
 2nd Road race, National Road Championships
2010
 1st Apertura Temporada de Quibor
 Vuelta a Venezuela
1st Stages 9 & 12
 2nd Clasico Corre Por La Vida
 3rd Overall Vuelta al Oriente
1st Stage 2
 3rd Overall Vuelta al Estado Zulia
1st Stage 6
2011
 2nd Overall Vuelta al Estado Zulia
1st Stage 2
 2nd Clásico Ciudad de Anaco
2012
 1st Clásica Virgen de Begoña
 1st Stage 1 Vuelta Ciclista Aragua
 1st Stage 2 Vuelta a Yacambu-Lara
2013
 1st Stage 6 Vuelta a Barinitas
 Vuelta a Venezuela
1st Stages 1, 5 & 10
2015
 1st Stage 1 Vuelta a Venezuela
 6th Copa Federación Venezolana de Ciclismo
2017
 10th Road race, Pan American Road Championships

References

External links
 
 

1984 births
Living people
People from Lara (state)
Venezuelan male cyclists
Venezuelan track cyclists
Vuelta a Venezuela stage winners
20th-century Venezuelan people
21st-century Venezuelan people